The Narragansett Pier Railroad  was a railroad in southern Rhode Island, running  from West Kingston to Narragansett Pier. It was built by the Hazard Family of Rhode Island to connect their textile mills in Peace Dale and Wakefield to the New York, Providence and Boston Railroad at Kingston Station as well as to ocean-going steamboats at Narragansett Pier.  Passenger service ran on the line from 1876 to 1952; the line continued freight operation as a Class III railroad until 1981. Most of the right-of-way has been converted to the William C. O'Neill Bike Path.

History

Formation and construction 
The Narragansett Pier Railroad was chartered in January 1868 and opened on July 17, 1876 from Kingston Railroad Station to Narragansett Pier.

Operation by the Hazard Family 
In 1890 the railway transported more than 100,000 passengers and several thousands tons of freight and luggage. An express train needed 13 minutes from Kingston to Narragansett. During the Gilded Age of Newport, Rhode Island, in the 1880s and '90s, privately owned railroad coaches belonging to famous families from Philadelphia, New York and other places would arrive at Kingston Station to be transferred to the NPRR to continue on to Narragansett Pier, where their passengers would then transfer to an NPRR-owned steamboat for the short trip across Narragansett Bay to their "summer cottages" at Newport. That service ended with the sale of the steamer MANISES at the end of the 1900 season.

Electric trolleys of the Sea View Line operated over the segment of the railroad between Peace Dale, Rhode Island and Narragansett Pier, Rhode Island from 1904 until 1907. However, the New Haven Railroad competed with the Narragansett Pier Railroad for passengers and began secret negotiations with the Sea View Line in 1904 to attract more through passengers from Providence to the Pier to the Sea View Line. The negotiations and the subsequent contract were treated as confidential by both parties, and the required construction work at Hunt’s River Crossing was conducted on a Saturday, to minimise the amount of attention: On June 25, 1904 conflict of interests occurred, when two railway maintenance teams met quietly on a Saturday morning at the Hunt’s River Crossing on the border between North Kingstown and East Greenwich. The workers of the New Haven Railroad built two wooden passenger platforms along their tracks, while those of the Sea View Electric Trolley line installed a spur from their line down a slight grade ending alongside the newly constructed passenger platforms.

From the first week of July 1904 weekend passengers could travel from Providence with four express trains each Saturday and Sunday morning and then change at Hunt's River into a waiting electric trolley express runs from there to the pier, and by the same arrangements return in the late afternoon or evening. The round trip cost only $1 in comparison to $1.25 for the ticket of the Narragansett Pier Railroad and an optional ticket upgrade included a shore dinner at a nearby Narragansett Pier hotel. Because the tram's Sea View’s Ouida Station was right next to the Pier beach house it saved the day trippers also ¾ mile of walking from the Boon Street station of the Narragansett Pier Railroad to the beach. Due to sinking passenger numbers, the Narragansett Pier Railroad cancelled its long-standing contract with the Sea View Line, whom they had allowed to use a section of the track towards  Wakefield and Peace Dale.

In 1907, the Sea View struck back: With the support of the New Haven Line and Marsden J. Perry’s United Electric Railway, it laid its own tracks from Sea View Junction, over the south side of Tower Hill and down the center of Main Street in Wakefield, stopping only just north of the Narragansett Pier tracks, because Narragansett Pier Railroad refused to let them cross its tracks.

A gas-electric rail car (colloquially a 'Doodlebug') was bought in 1940 for passenger service.

Royal Little 
Royal Little personally purchased the railroad from the Hazard Family in 1946. Little was also the founder and owner of Textron, then a textiles company.

The company's doodlebug broke one of its axles in June 1952, and was not repaired. Passenger service was subsequently officially terminated at the end of that year. With passenger service gone, only minimal freight traffic was carried to and from Narragansett Pier. At the behest of the State of Rhode Island, which was building a highway crossing the railroad right-of-way near Narragansett Pier, the now seldom-used segment beyond Wakefield was abandoned, shortening the line to approximately five miles in length.

Later owners 
Little decided to sell the railroad in 1953, and found a buyer in a lumber yard along the line, which paid $12,000 to take over. Another change of ownership took place in 1964, with J. Anthony Hanold becoming the line's new owner. Hanold brought back passenger service in the form of excursion trains, but these were not a success.

During the 1970s, freight traffic consisted of fertilizer, lumber and building products. Beset by continued declines in freight traffic, the entire remaining line was abandoned in 1981.

Legacy 

Approximately 6.8 miles of the railroad's right of way was converted into the William C. O'Neill Bike Path (formerly known as the South County Bike Path), with first phase completed in 2000 and second phase in 2003.  Phase three of the project is completed to Mumford Rd. in 2011. Phase IV has started to get funding as of June 2016. The railroad's two-stall roundhouse in Peace Dale still stands. The Peace Dale and Narragansett Pier train stations are also preserved.

Station listing

See also 

 Moshassuck Valley Railroad
 Warwick Railway
 Wood River Branch Railroad

External links 
  Edward J. Ozog: Narragansett Pier Railroad Company

References 

Defunct Rhode Island railroads
Narragansett, Rhode Island
South Kingstown, Rhode Island
Transportation in Washington County, Rhode Island
Railway companies established in 1868
Railway companies disestablished in 1981
1868 establishments in Rhode Island